Zach Gould (born June 20, 1997) is a Canadian professional box lacrosse player who currently plays with the Saskatchewan Rush of the National Lacrosse League (NLL). He was the first Saskatchewan-born player to sign a long term contract in the NLL.

Professional career
He was drafted in 2018 74th overall by the Saskatchewan Rush. He scored his first NLL goal on December 18th, 2018 in the battle of the prairies against the Saskatchewan's archrivals the Calgary Roughnecks. Gould has played for the Burnaby Lakers of the WLA.

References

External links 
Zach Gould at NLL.com

1997 births
Living people
Canadian lacrosse players
Lacrosse transitions
Saskatchewan Rush players
Sportspeople from Saskatoon